Aurelia labiata is a species of moon jellyfish. It is a cnidarian in the family Ulmaridae. However, much of its size range overlaps with A. aurita (up to ), making size an imperfect diagnostic tool. Most Aurelia labiata have a 16-scalloped bell, meaning the bell indents inward at 16 points, a characteristic that also appears in other Aurelia species. Aurelia labiata occurs in the northeastern Pacific Ocean, from the northern coast of California, north to Canada and into Alaska.

Behavior 
The Aurelia labiata have adaptive behaviors that include directional and vertical swimming. Directional swimming helps them escape from predators, approach to a food source, and swim through turbulence. Vertical swimming allows them to avoid rocky walls and low salinity. These behaviors come from their sensory receptors and nervous system that allows better mobility for their survival.

Predators 
Aurelia labiata are fed upon by other cnidarians such as Phacellophora camtschatica and Cyanea capillata.  Like many jellyfish, they are also consumed by sea turtles which are immune to their stings.

References

Further reading

Dawson, Michael N (2003). "Macro-morphological variation among cryptic species of the moon jellyfish, Aurelia (Cnidaria: Scyphozoa)". Marine Biology 143 (2): 369–379. .
Arai, Mary Needler. A Functional Biology of Scyphozoa. London: Chapman and Hall. pp. 68–206.

Lab
Cnidarians of the Pacific Ocean
Western North American coastal fauna
Marine fauna of Asia
Marine fauna of North America
Invertebrates of Japan
Invertebrates of the United States
Animals described in 1758
Taxa named by Carl Linnaeus